Natalia 'Saw Lady' Paruz is a  New York City-based musical saw player, bell ringer and busker. She is the founder and director of the annual Musical Saw Festival in New York City. She also organized the musical saw festival in Israel. She was a columnist of the 'Saw Player News' and a judge at international musical saw competitions.

Paruz has played the musical saw on many film soundtracks and can be seen as well as heard in the movie Dummy starring Adrien Brody. She has performed with orchestras such as the Israel Philharmonic Orchestra (conducted by Zubin Mehta), the Westchester Philharmonic, the Royal Air Moroccan Symphony Orchestra, the Amor Artis Orchestra, the Riverside Orchestra, the Manhattan Chamber Orchestra and at Lincoln Center's Avery Fisher Hall with PDQ Bach composer Peter Schickele and with the Little Orchestra Society. November 2007 marked her Carnegie Hall debut as a musical saw soloist and June 2008 her Madison Square Garden debut.
Her musical saw can be heard in many TV commercials. She has also appeared on numerous TV and radio programs around the world. Garrison Keillor of the Prairie Home Companion radio show has dubbed Natalia the show's 'official saw player'.
As a studio musician, her musical saw has been recorded by labels such as Atlantic Records, Capitol Records, and Universal Records, for albums of composers such as John Hiatt and Elliot Goldenthal.
She has played at festivals, such as the Spoleto Festival USA, the Lincoln Center Out-of-Doors Festival, Utah Arts Festival, World Trade Center's Buskers Fair and at the Fingerlakes Chamber Music Festival.

Paruz often plays the musical saw in contemporary music, encouraging today's composers to write music for this instrument.

Paruz is considered to be the most knowledgeable about the history of the musical saw, and her own home is a pilgrimage place for saw enthusiasts and students.

The December 3, 2011 'Washington Post' crossword puzzle had Paruz as a question: "Down 5 - Instrument played by Natalia Paruz".

Along with her professional career, Paruz makes a point to also perform on the streets and subways as a busker. She has busked in the US, Italy, Israel, Czech Republic, Poland and France.  Paruz has also served as a judge at the Music Under New York auditions for subway musicians.

Paruz also plays a set of 65 pitched cowbells, English handbells, 4-in-hand hand bells, theremin and glass harp.

Awards and honors

Paruz is a recipient of many awards, including:
 a citation of honor from the New York City Council
 a citation of honor from the New York State Senate
 a medal of honor from Paris, France.
She was chosen for the 'Best of New York' list of the 'Village Voice' two years in a row, as well as for the lists of 'Time Out New York', the 'New York Press' and the 'New York Resident'.
 Paruz is a recipient of grants from the Queens Council on the Arts, New York City Department of Cultural Affairs and New York State Council on the Arts.
 In 2009 Paruz organized the Guinness World Record of the 'Largest Musical Saw Ensemble', which gathered 53 musical saw players to perform together.
 In 2010 NYC Mayor Michael Bloomberg issued a proclamation honoring the annual Musical Saw Festival Natalia organizes since 2003.
 In 2011 NY State Assembly member Aravella Simotas issued a citation of honor proclaiming the NYC Musical Saw Festival for its "9 years of artistic excellence in Astoria".
 In 2013 Queens Borough President Helen Marshall issued a proclamation declaring June 1, 2013 to be the ‘Natalia Paruz & Musical Saw Festival Day’ in Queens.

Books mentioning Paruz
 City Lights: Stories About New York/St. Martin's Press
 New York Curiosities: Quirky Characters, Roadside Oddities & Other Offbeat Stuff/Globe Pequot
 Surprise: Embrace the Unpredictable and Engineer the Unexpected/Penguin Random House
 120 Jobs that Won't Chain You to Your Desk/Random House
 The Savvy Musician/Helius Press
 Overlooked New York/CreateSpace, by Zina Saunders
 Sounds of the Underground/Heidi Younger
 Teach a Man to Fish and Other Stories/Richard A. Schrader, Sr.
 Book in Czech - Zápisky osamělého poutníka s autoharfou/Martin Žák
 The Designs of Carrie Robbins/The United States Institute for Theatre Technology in cooperation with Broadway Press
 Buskers/Soft Skull Press
 Tampa Review 42/University of Tampa Press
 Get Lucky (How to Put Planned Serendipity to Work for You & Your Business)/Jossey-Bass
 Book in Spanish - Diario de un Músico Callejero/José Miguel Vilar, Editorial Renacimiento
 The Noise Beneath the Apple, by Heather Jacks
 Starting Your Career as a Musician/Skyhorse Publishing, Inc, by Neil Tortorella
 Music in American Life - An Encyclopedia of the Songs, Styles, Stars, and Stories That Shaped Our Culture/Greenwood
 Music Business Hacks: The Daily Habits of the Self-Made Musician/PACE Publishing
 The Sound of Mark/Mark Hastings - Zeloo Media
 An Immigrant's Guide to Making It In America/Virgilia Kaur Pruthi
 Book in Polish - Handbook of the Best Practices of 9 American & Canadian Cultural Institutions/Katarzyna Renes, Paderewski Institute, Poland
 Subway Beats/Kurt Boone, published by Schiffer Publishing
 Much Ado About Magic/Shanna Swendson, published in 2012 by Nla Digital LLC. The first page of the first chapter mentions a woman playing musical saw at the busking spot Natalia plays at.
 Outside the Jukebox: How I Turned My Vintage Music Obsession into My Dream Gig/Scott Bradlee, Hachette Books
 Holistic Wealth: 32 Life Lessons to Help You Find Purpose, Prosperity, and Happiness/Keisha Blair, Published by Catalyst Books
 Flea Circus Time Capsule (Spanish Edition)/Xavi Puk, chapter 10
 88 MORE Ways Music Can Change Your Life/Vincent James and Joann Pierdomenico
 Tell Her She Can't: Inspiring Stories of Unstoppable Women/Kelly Lewis, pages 143–147, 154, 192
 Passion For Practice With Musings From Music Masters/Becky Chaffee, page 37

Movie soundtracks with musical saw by Paruz

Theater soundtracks with musical saw by Paruz
 Monkey: Journey to the West, music by Damon Albarn (live show 2008)
 Midsummer Night's Dream, music by Elliot Goldenthal (album recording 2013)
 SawBones, music by Scott Munson (live show 2014)
 Clockwork Metaphysics, music by Stefano Bechini (live show 2015)
 Simon Dawes Becomes a Planet, music by Jared Dembowski (live show 2016)
 The Dragon Griswynd, music by Scott Munson (live show 2018)
 A La Memoire Des Enfants Perdus, music by Scott Munson (staged readings 2019)
 The Mouthtrap, music by Henry Purcell (soundtrack recording 2019)

Discography
 Singing Sounds of Saw (cassette)
 Hark! an Angel Sings (2002)
 I Saw the Future (2011)
 Playing on the Edge (2020)

See also
 NYC Busker Ball
 Busking

External links
Natalia 'Saw Lady' Paruz's website

Natalia's musical saw CDs
The annual NYC Musical Saw Festival, founded & directed by Natalia

Natalia's blog about busking
Saw Lady serenades New York City's straphangers at CBS News
The December 3rd 2011 crossword puzzle had Paruz as a question: Down 5 - Instrument played by Natalia Paruz at Washington Post

References 

American street performers
American percussionists
Jewish American musicians
Musicians from New York (state)
Israeli Jews
Israeli musicians
Year of birth missing (living people)
Living people
21st-century American Jews